The remains of St Mary's Abbey, of Kenilworth, Warwickshire, England are situated in the grounds of St Nicholas' Church and in an adjacent area of Abbey Fields.  Some of its ruins are above ground and some are below ground.

History
A priory for Augustinian canons was built on this site in about 1124 by Geoffrey de Clinton, which is about the same time as he built Kenilworth Castle. Gardens and pools were made near to the priory, and the priory gained additional land as gifts from Geoffrey de Clinton. A barn, a gatehouse, a belltower and an infirmary were subsequently built near to the main buildings of the priory, and St Nicholas's Church was built nearby in about 1291. The priory gradually gained wealth and the Pope upgraded its status to an abbey in 1447. St Mary's Abbey was signed over to King Henry VIII on 15 April 1538 with Abbot Simon Jekys receiving a handsome annual pension of £100 (the prior, John Lister, only received a pension of £8 with the remaining monks receiving between £5 and £7). The abbey was then dismantled at part of the Dissolution of the Monasteries. By about 1700 most of the abbey had become ruins except for the gatehouse and the barn. The ruins were excavated in 1840, 1880 and 1922, and most of the ruins were covered in 1967 for their protection.

In the early 21st century, a scheme funded by local councils and the Heritage Lottery Fund led to an exhibition in the Barn Museum and the placing of a number of plaques in the ground and on walls in the area of the site. The text on the plaques explains the historical significance of these portions of the site.

References

External links

Windows on Warwickshire
Warwick District Council
Map of Identifying Plaques

1120s establishments in England
Religious organizations established in the 1120s
St Mary's Abbey
Ruins in Warwickshire
Monasteries in Warwickshire
History of Warwickshire
Augustinian monasteries in England
Grade I listed buildings in Warwickshire
Christian monasteries established in the 12th century
1538 disestablishments in England
Ruined abbeys and monasteries